Gürleyik can refer to:

 Gürleyik, Honaz
 Gürleyik Waterfall